Ziarat (Urdu and ) is a city in the Ziarat District situated in the Balochistan. It is 
 from the capital city of Eastern Balochistan  Quetta. It was established as a district on 1st July 1986, before then it was part of Sibi district.

History
On 29 October 2008, at around 4 am, Ziarat and surrounding areas were struck by an earthquake doublet. The first tremor, 6.2 magnitude, lasted a couple of seconds, and was followed by a magnitude-6.4 tremor that lasted almost 30 seconds, destroying many mud houses and several government buildings. Neighbouring villages were also badly affected by the earthquake. More than 200 people were killed, and over 50,000 were left homeless. Landslides cut off many roads, making the area less accessible to emergency responders. Pakistani military helicopters were used to reach mountainous and remote locations.

Geography 
Ziarat is surrounded by the lush green Ziarat Juniper Forest, known locally as Sanober, home to the largest area of juniper forest (Juniperus seravschanica) in Pakistan, covering about 110,000 hectares.The juniper trees of Ziarat are one of the oldest trees of their kind with some of these trees being 4000 years old. It is believed that the forest is the second largest of its kind in the world. The indigenous tribes over here are Kakar and Tareen (including Raisani).

Climate 
Ziarat has a continental climate (Koppen: Dsa) and remains quite cool in summer compared to other cities in Pakistan.

References

Ziarat District
Populated places in Balochistan, Pakistan